"The Dead Heart" is a song by Australian rock band Midnight Oil. It was first released as a single in Australia in 1986 and in the United Kingdom and the United States in 1988 after it had been included on the 1987 album, Diesel and Dust. It peaked at number four on the Australian singles chart and at number 11 on the U.S. Mainstream rock chart. 

At the 1986 Countdown Australian Music Awards, the song was nominated for Best Single.

In January 2018, as part of Triple M's "Ozzest 100", the 'most Australian' songs of all time, "The Dead Heart" was ranked number 76.

Background
The song deals with the mistreatment of indigenous Australians and the nonrecognition of indigenous cultures in Australia, and was part of efforts to raise awareness of Australia's Stolen Generations - the forcible removal of Australian Aboriginal children from their families between 1909 and the 1970s.

Midnight Oil recorded "The Dead Heart" for the handing back ceremony of Uluru (Ayers Rock) to its traditional Aboriginal owners. The band was then invited to tour through some of the most remote communities in the Australian outback with the Aboriginal group, the Warumpi Band, a tour that was known as the Blackfella/Whitefella tour.

Track listing

Charts

Weekly charts

Year-end charts

References

1986 singles
1988 singles
Midnight Oil songs
Columbia Records singles
1986 songs
Songs written by Rob Hirst
Songs written by Jim Moginie
Songs written by Peter Garrett
Songs written by Martin Rotsey